Ali Ottman (born February 8, 1987) is an Arab-Israeli footballer, who has played for Maccabi Haifa.

References 

1987 births
Living people
Arab-Israeli footballers
Israeli footballers
Arab citizens of Israel
Israel international footballers
Bnei Sakhnin F.C. players
Maccabi Haifa F.C. players
Hapoel Qalansawe F.C. players
Israeli Premier League players
Liga Leumit players
Footballers from Sakhnin
Association football fullbacks
Israeli Footballer of the Year recipients